Kethna Louis (born 5 August 1996) is a Haitian footballer who plays as a centre back for French Division 1 Féminine club Stade de Reims and the Haiti women's national team.

International goals
Scores and results list Haiti's goal tally first

References

External links 
 

1996 births
Living people
People from Artibonite (department)
Haitian women's footballers
Women's association football central defenders
Division 1 Féminine players
Le Havre AC players
Haiti women's international footballers
Haitian expatriate footballers
Haitian expatriate sportspeople in France
Expatriate women's footballers in France
GPSO 92 Issy players